A Briefzentrum (English: Letter center) is a district center for the processing of letters for Deutsche Post.

History 
Before 1993, there were more than 1,000 centers for the processing of letters.

With the introduction of the new postal codes in Germany, 83 different district centers were built between 1994 and 1998. In 2003, Briefzentrum 42 (Wuppertal) was closed. Since then, there are only 82 district processing centers.

Size 
The processing centers are organized by size, which is determined by the number of letters processed daily: 
 S: 450,000-750,000
 M: 750,000-1,500,000
 L: 1,500,000–2,250,000
 XL: 2,250,000–3,000,000
 XXL: 3,000,000–4,500,000
 IPZ: 3,000,000-5,000,000 (International Center)

List of letter processing centers

External links 
Deutsche Post (German)
Briefzentren der Deutschen Post (German)

Deutsche Post
Postal system of Germany